Portland is a town in Ashley County, Arkansas, United States. The population was 430 at the 2010 census. Portland was first settled in the 1830s, and named for its early status as a steamboat port. It was incorporated in 1893.

Geography
Portland is located at  (33.236791, -91.511539).

Portland is located on north-south U.S. Route 165 at the junction with State Highway 160.

Points of interest
The historic Dean House and Pugh House were designed by architect Charles L. Thompson.  Both are listed on the U.S. National Register of Historic Places.

Demographics

2020 census

As of the 2020 United States census, there were 325 people, 178 households, and 92 families residing in the city.

2000 census
As of the census of 2000, there were 552 people, 213 households, and 152 families residing in the city. The racial makeup of the city was 55.62% White, 42.93% Black or African American, 0.18% Native American, 0.91% from other races, and 0.36% from two or more races.  2.72% of the population were Hispanic or Latino of any race.

There were 213 households, out of which 31.5% had children under the age of 18 living with them, 54.0% were married couples living together, 15.0% had a female householder with no husband present, and 28.2% were non-families. 26.3% of all households were made up of individuals, and 15.5% had someone living alone who was 65 years of age or older.  The average household size was 2.59 and the average family size was 3.12.

In the city, the population was spread out, with 27.4% under the age of 18, 8.2% from 18 to 24, 25.2% from 25 to 44, 21.7% from 45 to 64, and 17.6% who were 65 years of age or older.  The median age was 38 years. For every 100 females, there were 89.0 males.  For every 100 females age 18 and over, there were 93.7 males.

The median income for a household in the city was $28,036, and the median income for a family was $32,375. Males had a median income of $23,750 versus $20,446 for females. The per capita income for the city was $13,094.  About 14.5% of families and 15.9% of the population were below the poverty line, including 11.3% of those under age 18 and 19.3% of those age 65 or over.

Education 
Public education is provided to elementary and secondary school students by the Hamburg School District leading to graduation from Hamburg High School.

The Portland School District merged into the Hamburg district on July 1, 1984.

Notable people
Fred Haas, golfer, most famous for breaking Byron Nelson's eleven tournament winning streak in 1945
Lloyd Moseby, born in Portland, major league baseball player

Climate
The climate in this area is characterized by hot, humid summers and generally mild to cool winters.  According to the Köppen Climate Classification system, Portland has a humid subtropical climate, abbreviated "Cfa" on climate maps.

References

Cities in Ashley County, Arkansas
Cities in Arkansas